Tabtus (also Romanized as Tabţūs; also known as Tapţūs) is a village in Rahimabad Rural District, Rahimabad District, Rudsar County, Gilan Province, Iran. At the 2006 census, its population was 39, in 11 families.

References 

Populated places in Rudsar County